Pultenaea elachista is a species of flowering plant in the family Fabaceae and is endemic to southern Australia. It is an erect, spindly shrub with hairy foliage, oblong to egg-shaped leaves with a pointed tip, and yellow flowers with red or orange markings.

Description
There is a point on the ends of the leaves, the edges are rolled under, there are lance-shaped stipules at the base and the lower surface is densely woolly-hairy. Flowering occurs from July to December and the fruit is a hairy pod.

Taxonomy and naming
This species was first formally described in 1875 by Ferdinand von Mueller who gave it the name Gastrolobium elachistum in Fragmenta phytographiae Australiae. In 1982, Michael Crisp changed the name to Pultenaea elachista in the Journal of the Adelaide Botanic Gardens. The specific epithet (elachista) means "smallest", referring to the leaves.

Distribution
Pultenaea elachista grows on plains in the Coolgardie, Esperance Plains, Hampton and Mallee biogeographic regions of southern Western Australia and in the Nullarbor, Eyre Peninsula and Kangaroo Island regions of South Australia.

Conservation status
Pultenaea elachista is classified as "not threatened" by the Government of Western Australia Department of Parks and Wildlife.

References

elachista
Eudicots of Western Australia
Flora of South Australia
Plants described in 1875
Taxa named by Ferdinand von Mueller